Nichael "Michael" Bluth is a fictional character and the protagonist of the American television sitcom Arrested Development, created by Mitchell Hurwitz, and portrayed by Jason Bateman. Michael serves as the series straight man, and leads his family through its many crises.

Character history
Michael (born December 14, 1967) is the second oldest Bluth son, and the father of George Michael Bluth. He has an older brother, G.O.B. (pronounced like the biblical character Job), a younger half-brother, Buster, and a twin sister, Lindsay (she is later revealed to be adopted and older than Michael). He also has an adopted Korean brother named Annyong, who is almost 20 years younger.

When his father George Sr. goes to jail, Michael becomes head of the family and CEO and President of the Bluth Company. His authority, however, is constantly undermined by his family. He remained President for all of Season 1, but was replaced by G.O.B. in Season 2. As Vice President, Michael was the Bluth Company's de facto head, doing all the work of the President while being scrutinized by the SEC for his father's crimes. In Season 3, Michael was firmly in charge again, though the sibling rivalry and family interference did not totally recede.

Michael is the most functional and level-headed Bluth, but can occasionally be dishonest and selfish. He is usually the only source of stability for his family, much to his chagrin. Despite this, he has a problem letting go of control, and tends not to listen to his son's feelings when making decisions for him. He is especially critical of George Michael's girlfriend, Ann, often forgetting her name, and frequently referring to her as any number of random, only loosely appropriate monikers, including "Egg", "Bland", "Plant", "Yam", and (with thinly-veiled disappointment and raised eyebrows) "Her?" He often threatens to leave the family out of frustration.

Michael's wife Tracy died (presumably of ovarian cancer) two years prior to the first season, and she was in a coma for some months before she passed. In the show, Michael is often reluctant to date, thinking that his son would disapprove, and most of his relationships have featured misunderstandings or outright deception. His wife's death is usually the subject of tasteless and unaware jokes made by his family members.

In season 3, it is revealed that there is a typo on his birth certificate and that his legal name is Nichael Bluth. Also, Michael discovers the truth about his father's crimes and his sister's identity. In the last episode, Michael and his son George Michael try once more to abandon the Bluth family by sailing away on a yacht, but after they arrive at the new home, they find that George Sr. was also on the yacht.

In season 4, Michael's fortunes decline swiftly and he becomes more petulant, narcissistic, and guile as he avoids a massive debt to Lucille Austero, manipulates his family into signing away their movie portrayal rights, and allows his relationship with George Michael to deteriorate by encroaching on his privacy, petulantly avoiding him, and carrying on a relationship with the same woman as his son.

As of the end of season 4, Michael is the only character who has appeared in every episode of the series.

Development
Michael is generally the straight man in the series.  However, creator Mitch Hurwitz says that in some respects Michael is "the craziest one" in that he cannot see much of what happens around him.

Michael is portrayed by actor Jason Bateman. Hurwitz did not know if Bateman was right for the part as he seemed associated with more conventional sitcoms, but Hurwitz said that in trying out for the part, Bateman "gave this dry, confident performance".  Bateman also explained his performance by saying he could be "naturally... dickish" like his character.  Bateman said of his part, "it's the best job I've ever had, hands down," and it may have also been his most famous one.

Reception
Bateman and his character were also well received by critic Robert Bianco, who wrote "the key to the show's success is the hilariously deadpan Bateman".

Bateman was nominated for seven individual awards for his portrayal of Michael Bluth, winning three.  In 2004, Bateman was nominated for the Screen Actors Guild Award for Outstanding Performance by a Male Actor in a Comedy Series. In 2004 and again in 2005, he was nominated for a Television Critics Association Award for Individual Achievement in Comedy. In 2005, Bateman was also nominated for Primetime Emmy Award for Outstanding Lead Actor in a Comedy Series. Bateman won the 2005 Golden Globe Award for Best Actor – Television Series Musical or Comedy and the 2005 Satellite Award for Best Actor – Television Series Musical or Comedy, which he won again in 2006. On July 18, 2013, Bateman was nominated again for the Primetime Emmy Award for Outstanding Lead Actor in a Comedy Series for his portrayal of Michael Bluth.

See also
List of Arrested Development characters

References

American sitcom television characters
Arrested Development
Fictional businesspeople
Fictional characters from Orange County, California
Television characters introduced in 2003
Fictional producers
Fictional people from the 20th-century